Alba Montserrat Tarín (born 9 June 1984) is a Spanish former football goalkeeper, who most recently played for RCD Espanyol of Spain's Primera División.

Montserrat played her final game for Espanyol in April 2012, then emigrated to Munich for her career outside football.

References

External links
Profile at AupaAthletic.com 

1984 births
Living people
Spanish women's footballers
Footballers from Barcelona
Sportswomen from Catalonia
Primera División (women) players
CE Sabadell Femení players
UE L'Estartit players
RCD Espanyol Femenino players
Women's association football goalkeepers
FC Barcelona Femení players
Campeonato Nacional de Futebol Feminino players
Expatriate women's footballers in Portugal
S.U. 1º Dezembro (women) players